Wittering, West Sussex or The Witterings refers to two civil parishes in the Chichester district of West Sussex.

 East Wittering
 West Wittering
The Witterings (ward), a ward on Chichester District Council

See also 
 Wittering (disambiguation)